A list of Charges of the Theta Delta Chi fraternity.

Active Charges
In order of original chartering:

Dormant Charges

External links
 

Lists of chapters of United States student societies by society
charges